The following is a list of awards and nominations received by American actress, singer, and television personality Keke Palmer.

Awards and nominations

Notes

References

External links 
  

Palmer, Keke
Palmer, Keke